Enrico Alberto (18 November 1933 – 20 April 2019) was an Italian professional football player and manager active primarily in France, where he was known as Henri Alberto and played as a goalkeeper.

Career
Born in Paesana, Alberto played for Aubenas, Lyon, Monaco, Sochaux, Grenoble, Wiener SC, Ajaccio and Avignon. With Monaco he won the Ligue 1 title and the Coupe de France. He later managed Aubenas.

Later life and death
Alberto died on 23 April 2019, at the age of 85, and was buried in Aubenas.

References

External links
 

1933 births
2019 deaths
Sportspeople from the Province of Cuneo
Italian footballers
Association football goalkeepers
Olympique Lyonnais players
AS Monaco FC players
FC Sochaux-Montbéliard players
Grenoble Foot 38 players
Wiener Sport-Club players
AC Ajaccio players
AC Avignonnais players
Ligue 1 players
Ligue 2 players
Italian football managers
Italian expatriate footballers
Italian expatriate football managers
Italian emigrants to France
Italian expatriate sportspeople in Austria
Expatriate footballers in France
Expatriate footballers in Austria
Expatriate football managers in France
Footballers from Piedmont